Ranger is an unincorporated community in western Lincoln County, West Virginia, United States.  It lies along West Virginia Route 10 southwest of the town of Hamlin, the county seat of Lincoln County.  Its elevation is 614 feet (187 m).  It has a post office with the ZIP code 25557. Ranger is served by the Guyan River VFD.

The community takes its name from Ranger Branch creek.

References

Unincorporated communities in Lincoln County, West Virginia
Unincorporated communities in West Virginia
Populated places on the Guyandotte River